Research into music and emotion seeks to understand the psychological relationship between human affect and music. The field, a branch of music psychology, covers numerous areas of study, including the nature of emotional reactions to music, how characteristics of the listener may determine which emotions are felt, and which components of a musical composition or performance may elicit certain reactions. The research draws upon, and has significant implications for, such areas as philosophy, musicology, music therapy, music theory, and aesthetics, as well as the acts of musical composition and of musical performance like a concert.

Philosophical approaches

Appearance emotionalism 
Two of the most influential philosophers in the aesthetics of music are Stephen Davies and Jerrold Levinson. Davies calls his view of the expressiveness of emotions in music "appearance emotionalism", which holds that music expresses emotion without feeling it. Objects can convey emotion because their structures can contain certain characteristics that resemble emotional expression. He says, "The resemblance that counts most for music's expressiveness ... is between music's temporally unfolding dynamic structure and configurations of human behaviour associated with the expression of emotion." The observer can note emotions from the listener's posture, gait, gestures, attitude, and comportment.

Associations between musical features and emotion differ among individuals. Appearance emotionalism claims many listeners' perceiving associations constitutes the expressiveness of music. Which musical features are more commonly associated with which emotions is part of music psychology. Davies says that expressiveness is an objective property of music and not subjective in the sense of being projected into the music by the listener. Music's expressiveness is certainly response-dependent, i.e. it is realized in the listener's judgement.  Skilled listeners very similarly attribute emotional expressiveness to a certain piece of music, thereby indicating according to Davies that the expressiveness of music is somewhat objective because if the music lacked expressiveness, then no expression could be projected into it as a reaction to the music.

Process theory
The philosopher Jennifer Robinson assumes the existence of a mutual dependence between cognition and elicitation in her description of "emotions as process, music as process" theory, or process theory. Robinson argues that the process of emotional elicitation begins with an "automatic, immediate response that initiates motor and autonomic activity and prepares us for possible action" causing a process of cognition that may enable listeners to name the felt emotion. This series of events continually exchanges with new, incoming information. Robinson argues that emotions may transform into one another, causing blends, conflicts, and ambiguities that make impede describing with one word the emotional state that one experiences at any given moment; instead, inner feelings are better thought of as the products of multiple emotional streams. Robinson argues that music is a series of simultaneous processes, and that it therefore is an ideal medium for mirroring such more cognitive aspects of emotion as musical themes' desiring resolution or leitmotif's mirrors memory processes. These simultaneous musical processes can reinforce or conflict with each other and thus also express the way one emotion "morphs into another over time".

Conveying emotion through music
The ability to perceive emotion in music is said to develop early in childhood, and improve significantly throughout development. The capacity to perceive emotion in music is also subject to cultural influences, and both similarities and differences in emotion perception have been observed in cross-cultural studies.  Empirical research has looked at which emotions can be conveyed as well as what structural factors in music help contribute to the perceived emotional expression. There are two schools of thought on how we interpret emotion in music. The cognitivists' approach argues that music simply displays an emotion, but does not allow for the personal experience of emotion in the listener. Emotivists argue that music elicits real emotional responses in the listener.

It has been argued that the emotion experienced from a piece of music is a multiplicative function of  structural features, performance features, listener features, contextual features and extra-musical features of the piece, shown as:

Experienced Emotion = Structural features × Performance features × Listener features × Contextual features × Extra-Musical features

where:

Structural features = Segmental features × Suprasegmental features
Performance features = Performer skill × Performer state
Listener features = Musical expertise × Stable disposition × Current motivation
Contextual features = Location × Event
Extra-musical features = Non-auditory features × Expertise

Structural features
Structural features are divided into two parts, segmental features and suprasegmental features. Segmental features are the individual sounds or tones that make up the music; this includes acoustic structures such as duration, amplitude, and pitch. Suprasegmental features are the foundational structures of a piece, such as melody, tempo and rhythm. There are a number of specific musical features that are highly associated with particular emotions. Within the factors affecting emotional expression in music, tempo is typically regarded as the most important, but a number of other factors, such as mode, loudness, and melody, also influence the emotional valence of the piece.

Some studies find that perception of basic emotional features are a cultural universal, though people can more easily perceive emotion, and perceive more nuanced emotion, in music from their own culture. Music without lyrics is unlikely to elicit social emotions like anger, shame, and jealousy; it typically only elicits basic emotions, like happiness and sadness.

Music has a direct connection to emotional states present in human beings. Different musical structures have been found to have a relationship with physiological responses. Research has shown that suprasegmental structures such as tonal space, specifically dissonance, create unpleasant negative emotions in participants. The emotional responses were measured with physiological assessments, such as skin conductance and electromyographic signals (EMG), while participants listened to musical excerpts. Further research on psychophysiological measures pertaining to music were conducted and found similar results; musical structures of rhythmic articulation, accentuation, and tempo were found to correlate strongly with physiological measures, the measured used here included heart rate and respiratory monitors that correlated with self-report questionnaires.

These associations can be innate, learned, or both. Studies on young children and isolated cultures show innate associations for features are similar to a human voice (e.g. low and slow is sad, faster and high is happy). Cross-cultural studies show that associations between major mode vs. minor mode and consonance vs. dissonance are probably learned.

Music also affects socially-relevant memories, specifically memories produced by nostalgic musical excerpts (e.g., music from a significant time period in one’s life, like music listened to on road trips). Musical structures are more strongly interpreted in certain areas of the brain when the music evokes nostalgia. The interior frontal gyrus, substantia nigra, cerebellum, and insula were all identified to have a stronger correlation with nostalgic music than not. Brain activity is a very individualized concept with many of the musical excerpts having certain effects based on individuals’ past life experiences, thus this caveat should be kept in mind when generalizing findings across individuals.

Performance features
Performance features refer to the manner in which a piece of music is executed by the performer(s). These are broken into two categories: performer skills, and performer state. Performer skills are the compound ability and appearance of the performer; including physical appearance, reputation, and technical skills. The performer state is the interpretation, motivation, and stage presence of the performer.

Listener features 
Listener features refer to the individual and social identity of the listener(s). This includes their personality, age, knowledge of music, and motivation to listen to the music.

Contextual features
Contextual features are aspects of the performance such as the location and the particular occasion for the performance (i.e., funeral, wedding, dance).

Extra-musical features
Extra-musical features refer to  extra-musical information detached from auditory music signals, such as the genre or style of music.

These different factors influence expressed emotion at different magnitudes, and their effects are compounded by one another. Thus, experienced emotion is felt to a stronger degree if more factors are present. The order the factors are listed within the model denotes how much weight in the equation they carry. For this reason, the bulk of research has been done in structural features and listener features.

Conflicting cues
Which emotion is perceived is dependent on the context of the piece of music. Past research has argued that opposing emotions like happiness and sadness fall on a bipolar scale, where both cannot be felt at the same time. More recent research has suggested that happiness and sadness are experienced separately, which implies that they can be felt concurrently. One study investigated the latter possibility by having participants listen to computer-manipulated musical excerpts that have mixed cues between tempo and mode.   Examples of mix-cue music include a piece with major key and slow tempo, and a minor-chord piece with a fast tempo. Participants then rated the extent to which the piece conveyed happiness or sadness. The results indicated that mixed-cue music conveys both happiness and sadness; however, it remained unclear whether participants perceived happiness and sadness simultaneously or vacillated between these two emotions.   A follow-up study was done to examine these possibilities. While listening to mixed or consistent cue music, participants pressed one button when the music conveyed happiness, and another button when it conveyed sadness.  The results revealed that subjects pressed both buttons simultaneously during songs with conflicting cues. These findings indicate that listeners can perceive  both happiness and sadness concurrently.  This has significant implications for how the structural features influence emotion, because when a mix of structural cues is used, a number of emotions may be conveyed.

Specific listener features

Development
Studies indicate that the ability to understand emotional messages in music starts early, and improves throughout child development. Studies investigating music and emotion in children primarily play a musical excerpt for children and have them look at pictorial expressions of faces. These facial expressions display different emotions and children are asked to select the face that best matches the music's emotional tone. Studies have shown that children are able to assign specific emotions to pieces of music; however, there is debate regarding the age at which this ability begins.

Infants
An infant is often exposed to a mother's speech that is musical in nature. It is possible that the motherly singing allows the mother to relay emotional messages to the infant.  Infants also tend to prefer positive speech to neutral speech as well as happy music to negative music. It has also been posited that listening to their mother's singing may play a role in identity formation. This hypothesis is supported by a study that interviewed adults and asked them to describe musical experiences from their childhood. Findings showed that music was good for developing knowledge of emotions during childhood.

Pre-school children
These studies have shown that children at the age of 4 are able to begin to distinguish between emotions found in musical excerpts in ways that are similar to adults. The ability to distinguish these musical emotions seems to increase with age until adulthood. However, children at the age of 3 were unable to make the distinction between emotions expressed in music through matching a facial expression with the type of emotion found in the music. Some emotions, such as anger and fear, were also found to be harder to distinguish within music.

Elementary-age children
In studies with four-year-olds and five-year-olds, they are asked to label musical excerpts with the affective labels "happy", "sad", "angry", and "afraid".  Results in one study showed that four-year-olds did not perform above chance with the labels "sad" and "angry", and the five-year-olds did not perform above chance with the label "afraid".  A follow-up study found conflicting results, where five-year-olds performed much like adults. However, all ages confused categorizing "angry" and "afraid".
Pre-school and elementary-age children listened to twelve short melodies, each in either major or minor mode, and were instructed to choose between four pictures of faces: happy, contented, sad, and angry. All the children, even as young as three years old, performed above chance in assigning positive faces with major mode and negative faces with minor mode.

Personality effects
Different people perceive events differently based upon their individual characteristics. Similarly, the emotions elicited by listening to different types of music seem to be affected by factors such as personality and previous musical training. People with the personality type of agreeableness have been found to have higher emotional responses to music in general. Stronger sad feelings have also been associated with people with personality types of agreeableness and neuroticism. While some studies have shown that musical training can be correlated with music that evoked mixed feelings  as well as higher IQ and test of emotional comprehension scores, other studies refute the claim that musical training affects perception of emotion in music. It is also worth noting that previous exposure to music can affect later behavioral choices, schoolwork, and social interactions. Therefore, previous music exposure does seem to have an effect on the personality and emotions of a child later in their life, and would subsequently affect their ability to perceive as well as express emotions during exposure to music. Gender, however, has not been shown to lead to a difference in perception of emotions found in music.  Further research into which factors affect an individual's perception of emotion in music and the ability of the individual to have music-induced emotions are needed.

Eliciting emotion through music
Along with the research that music conveys an emotion to its listener(s), it has also been shown that music can produce emotion in the listener(s). This view often causes debate because the emotion is produced within the listener, and is consequently hard to measure. In spite of controversy, studies have shown observable responses to elicited emotions, which reinforces the Emotivists' view that music does elicit real emotional responses.

Responses to elicited emotion
The structural features of music not only help convey an emotional message to the listener, but also may create emotion in the listener.  These emotions can be completely new feelings or may be an extension of previous emotional events. Empirical research has shown how listeners can absorb the piece's expression as their own emotion, as well as invoke a unique response based on their personal experiences.

Basic emotions
In research on eliciting emotion, participants report personally feeling a certain emotion in response to hearing a musical piece. Researchers have investigated whether the same structures that conveyed a particular emotion could elicit it as well. The researchers presented excerpts of fast tempo, major mode music and slow tempo, minor tone music to participants; these musical structures were chosen because they are known to convey happiness and sadness respectively. Participants rated their own emotions with elevated levels of happiness after listening to music with structures that convey happiness and elevated sadness after music with structures that convey sadness.

This evidence suggests that the same structures that convey emotions in music can also elicit those same emotions in the listener. In light of this finding, there has been particular controversy about music eliciting negative emotions. Cognitivists argue that choosing to listen to music that elicits negative emotions like sadness would be paradoxical, as listeners would not willingly strive to induce sadness, whereas emotivists purport that music can elicit negative emotions, and listeners knowingly choose to listen in order to feel sadness in an impersonal way, similar to a viewer's desire to watch a tragic film. The reasons why people sometimes listen to sad music when feeling sad has been explored by means of interviewing people about their motivations for doing so. As a result of this research, it has been found that people sometimes listen to sad music when feeling sad to intensify feelings of sadness. Other reasons for listening to sad music when feeling sad were in order to retrieve memories, to feel closer to other people, for cognitive reappraisal, to feel befriended by the music, to distract oneself, and for mood enhancement.

Researchers have also found an effect between one's familiarity with a piece of music and the emotions it elicits. One study suggested that familiarity with a piece of music increases the emotions experienced by the listener; half of participants were played twelve random musical excerpts one time, and rated their emotions after each piece. The other half of the participants listened to twelve random excerpts five times, and started their ratings on the third repetition. Findings showed that participants who listened to the excerpts five times rated their emotions with higher intensity than the participants who listened to them only once.

Emotional memories and actions
Music may not only elicit new emotions, but connect listeners with other emotional sources.  Music serves as a powerful cue to recall emotional memories back into awareness. Because music is such a pervasive part of social life, present in weddings, funerals and religious ceremonies, it brings back emotional memories that are often already associated with it.  Music is also processed by the lower, sensory levels of the brain, making it impervious to later memory distortions. Therefore creating a strong connection between emotion and music within memory makes it easier to recall one when prompted by the other. Music can also tap into empathy, inducing emotions that are assumed to be felt by the performer or composer. Listeners can become sad because they recognize that those emotions must have been felt by the composer, much as the viewer of a play can empathize for the actors.

Listeners may also respond to emotional music through action. Throughout history music was composed to inspire people into specific action - to march, dance, sing or fight. Consequently, heightening the emotions in all these events.  In fact, many people report being unable to sit still when certain rhythms are played, in some cases even engaging in subliminal actions when physical manifestations should be suppressed. Examples of this can be seen in young children's spontaneous outbursts into motion upon hearing music, or exuberant expressions shown at concerts.

Juslin and Västfjäll's BRECVEM model

Juslin and Västfjäll developed a model of seven ways in which music can elicit emotion, called the BRECVEM model. 

 Brain stem reflex: "This refers to a process whereby an emotion is induced by music because one or more fundamental acoustical characteristics of the music are taken by the brain stem to signal a potentially important and urgent event. All other things being equal, sounds that are sudden, loud, dissonant, or feature fast temporal patterns induce arousal or feelings of unpleasantness in listeners...Such responses reflect the impact of auditory sensations – music as sound in the most basic sense."

 Rhythmic entrainment: "This refers to a process whereby an emotion is evoked by a piece of music because a powerful, external rhythm in the music influences some internal bodily rhythm of the listener (e.g. heart rate), such that the latter rhythm adjusts toward and eventually 'locks in' to a common periodicity. The adjusted heart rate can then spread to other components of emotion such as feeling, through proprioceptive feedback. This may produce an increased level of arousal in the listener." 

 Evaluative conditioning: "This refers to a process whereby an emotion is induced by a piece of music simply because this stimulus has been paired repeatedly with other positive or negative stimuli. Thus, for instance, a particular piece of music may have occurred repeatedly together in time with a specific event that always made you happy (e.g., meeting your best friend). Over time, through repeated pairings, the music will eventually come to evoke happiness even in the absence of the friendly interaction."

 Emotional contagion: "This refers to a process whereby an emotion is induced by a piece of music because the listener perceives the emotional expression of the music, and then 'mimics' this expression internally, which by means of either peripheral feedback from muscles, or a more direct activation of the relevant emotional representations in the brain, leads to an induction of the same emotion."

 Visual imagery: "This refers to a process whereby an emotion is induced in a listener because he or she conjures up visual images (e.g., of a beautiful landscape) while listening to the music."

 Episodic memory: "This refers to a process whereby an emotion is induced in a listener because the music evokes a memory of a particular event in the listener's life. This is sometimes referred to as the 'Darling, they are playing our tune' phenomenon."

 Musical expectancy: "This refers to a process whereby an emotion is induced in a listener because a specific feature of the music violates, delays, or confirms the listener's expectations about the continuation of the music."

Musical expectancy

With regards to violations of expectation in music several interesting results have been found. It has for example been found that listening to unconventional music may sometimes cause a meaning threat and result in compensatory behaviour in order to restore meaning.   Musical expectancy is defined as a process whereby an emotion is aroused in a listener because a specific feature of the music violates, delays, or confirms the listener's expectations about the continuation of the music. Every time the listener hears a piece of music, he or she has such expectations, based on music he or she has heard before. For example, the sequential progression of E-F# may set up the expectation that the music will continue with G#. In other words, some notes seem to imply other notes; and if these musical implications are not realized — if the listener's expectations are thwarted — an affective response might be induced.

Aesthetic judgement and BRECVEMA

In 2013, Juslin created an additional aspect to the BRECVEM model called aesthetic judgement. This is the criteria which each individual has as a metric for music's aesthetic value. This can involve a number of varying personal preferences, such as the message conveyed, skill presented or novelty of style or idea.

Comparison of conveyed and elicited emotions

Evidence for emotion in music
There has been a bulk of evidence that listeners can identify specific emotions with certain types of music, but there has been less concrete evidence that music may elicit emotions.  This is due to the fact that elicited emotion is subjective; and thus, it is difficult to find a valid criterion to study it.  Elicited and conveyed emotion in music is usually understood from three types of evidence: self-report, physiological responses, and expressive behavior. Researchers use one or a combination of these methods to investigate emotional reactions to music.

Self-report
The self-report method is a verbal report by the listener regarding what they are experiencing. This is the most widely used method for studying emotion and has shown that people identify emotions and personally experience emotions while listening to music.  Research in the area has shown that listeners' emotional responses are highly consistent. In fact, a meta-analysis of 41 studies on music performance found that happiness, sadness, tenderness, threat, and anger were identified above chance by listeners. Another study compared untrained listeners to musically trained listeners.  Both groups were required to categorize musical excerpts that conveyed similar emotions. The findings showed that the categorizations were not different between the trained and untrained; thus demonstrating that the untrained listeners are highly accurate in perceiving emotion. It is more difficult to find evidence for elicited emotion, as it depends solely on the subjective response of the listener. This leaves reporting vulnerable to self-report biases such as participants responding according to social prescriptions or responding as they think the experimenter wants them to.  As a result, the validity of the self-report method is often questioned, and consequently researchers are reluctant to draw definitive conclusions solely from these reports.

Physiological responses
Emotions are known to create physiological, or bodily, changes in a person, which can be tested experimentally. Some evidence shows one of these changes is within the nervous system.   Arousing music is related to increased heart rate and muscle tension; calming music is connected to decreased heart rate and muscle tension, and increased skin temperature. Other research identifies outward physical responses such as shivers or goose bumps to be caused by changes in harmony and tears or lump-in-the-throat provoked by changes in melody. Researchers test these responses through the use of instruments for physiological measurement, such as recording pulse rate.

Expressive behavior
People are also known to show outward manifestations of their emotional states while listening to music. Studies using facial electromyography (EMG) have found that people react with subliminal facial expressions when listening to expressive music. In addition, music provides a stimulus for expressive behavior in many social contexts, such as concerts, dances, and ceremonies. Although these expressive behaviors can be measured experimentally, there have been very few controlled studies observing this behavior.

Strength of effects
Within the comparison between elicited and conveyed emotions, researchers have examined the relationship between these two types of responses to music. In general, research agrees that feeling and perception ratings are highly correlated, but not identical.  More specifically, studies are inconclusive as to whether one response has a stronger effect than the other, and in what ways these two responses relate.

Conveyed more than elicited
In one study, participants heard a random selection of 24 excerpts, displaying six types of emotions, five times in a row.  Half the participants described the emotions the music conveyed, and the other half responded with how the music made them feel. The results found that emotions conveyed by music were more intense than the emotions elicited by the same piece of music. Another study investigated under what specific conditions strong emotions were conveyed. Findings showed that ratings for conveyed emotions were higher in happy responses to music with consistent cues for happiness (i.e., fast tempo and major mode), for sad responses to music with consistent cues for sadness (i.e., slow tempo and minor mode,) and for sad responses in general. These studies suggest that people can recognize the emotion displayed in music more readily than feeling it personally.

Sometimes conveyed, sometimes elicited
Another study that had 32 participants listen to twelve musical pieces and found that the strength of perceived and elicited emotions were dependent on the structures of the piece of music.  Perceived emotions were stronger than felt emotions when listeners rated for arousal and positive and negative activation. On the other hand, elicited emotions were stronger than perceived emotions when rating for pleasantness.

Elicited more than conveyed
In another study analysis revealed that emotional responses were stronger than the listeners' perceptions of emotions.  This study used a between-subjects design, where 20 listeners judged to what extent they perceived four emotions: happy, sad, peaceful, and scared. A separate 19 listeners rated to what extent they experienced each of these emotions. The findings showed that all music stimuli elicited specific emotions for the group of participants rating elicited emotion, while music stimuli only occasionally conveyed emotion to the participants in the group identifying which emotions the music conveyed. 
Based on these inconsistent findings, there is much research left to be done in order to determine how conveyed and elicited emotions are similar and different. There is disagreement about whether music induces 'true' emotions or if the emotions reported as felt in studies are instead just participants stating the emotions found in the music they are listening to.

Music as a therapeutic tool

Music therapy as a therapeutic tool has been shown to be an effective treatment for various ailments. Therapeutic techniques involve eliciting emotions by listening to music, composing music or lyrics and performing music.
 
Music therapy sessions may have the ability to help drug users who are attempting to break a drug habit, with users reporting feeling better able to feel emotions without the aid of drug use. Music therapy may also be a viable option for people experiencing extended stays in a hospital due to illness. In one study, music therapy provided child oncology patients with enhanced environmental support elements and elicited more engaging behaviors from the child. When treating troubled teenagers, a study by Keen revealed that music therapy has allowed therapists to interact with teenagers with less resistance, thus facilitating self-expression in the teenager.
 
Music therapy has also shown great promise in individuals with autism, serving as an emotional outlet for these patients. While other avenues of emotional expression and understanding may be difficult for people with autism, music may provide those with limited understanding of socio-emotional cues a way of accessing emotion.

References

Further reading
Gabrielsson, Alf (2011). Strong experiences with music: Music is much more than just music. Oxford University Press. 
Juslin, Patrik N., and John Sloboda, eds (2011). Handbook of music and emotion: Theory, research, applications. Oxford University Press.

Emotion
Music psychology
Philosophy of music